Torit is a city of Eastern Equatoria State in South Sudan.

History

On 18 August 1955, the Equatoria Corps mutinied at Torit, starting the First Sudanese Civil War. In 1964 the military government in Khartoum closed "all the Christian mission schools" in the area. Torit was upgraded to Municipality status administered by a mayor on August 19, 2013.

Location
The city is in Torit County in Eastern Equatoria State, in the southeastern part of South Sudan, close to the international border with the Republic of Uganda. The coordinates of Torit are: 4° 24' 28.80"N, 32° 34' 30.00"E (Latitude:4.4080; Longitude:32.5750).

Population
The population of Torit was last estimated at 20,050, in 2004, and, according to census results, 33,657 in 2008.

Education 
Equatoria International University temporarily opened in Torit on 21 June 2019, although the university is building a permanent site south of the city.

Points of interest
The following points of interest are found in Torit:

 Fr Saturlino Ohure Mausoleum 
 The offices of Torit Town Council
 The headquarters of Torit County
 The headquarters of Eastern Equatoria State
 Dr John Garang Memorial Secondary School, Torit
 Torit Day Secondary School
 Torit East Primary School
 Torit Hospital
 Torit State Hospital
 The Juba-Lokichogio Road - The road, which is the primary land route to and from Kenya, passes through Torit
 Torit Airport - A small civilian airport
 Lomoliha Market - The central market for the town.
 Johnson Akio Secondary School
 Fr. saturlino Ohure Secondary School

See also
 Torit Airport
 Eastern Equatoria
 Equatoria

References

External links

Location of Torit At Google Maps

Populated places in Eastern Equatoria
State capitals in South Sudan